Arlberg Express (German: Arlberg-Express) is a 1948 Austrian thriller film directed by Eduard von Borsody and starring Paul Hubschmid, Elfe Gerhart and Iván Petrovich.

The film's sets were designed by the art director Julius von Borsody.

Synopsis
After returning to Vienna following three years as a prisoner of war, Hans Leitner becomes mixed up a suitcase of stolen jewels and a gang of criminals. Eventually he attempts to escape on the Orient Express.

Cast
 Paul Hubschmid as Hans Leitner 
 Elfe Gerhart as Christl Andermann 
 Iván Petrovich as Barna 
 Hans Putz as Flori Reutner 
 Hugo Gottschlich as Toni 
 Otto Treßler as Tschurtschrntaler 
 Alma Seidler as Lissy 
 Liesl Andergast as Frau Steindl 
 Melanie Horeschowsky as Frau Hellmann 
 Susanne Engelhart as Wirtschafterin 
 Josef Krastel as Der Dorflehrer 
 Gretl Rainer as Seine Frau

References

Bibliography 
 Fritsche, Maria. Homemade Men in Postwar Austrian Cinema: Nationhood, Genre and Masculinity. Berghahn Books, 2013.

External links 
 

1948 films
Austrian thriller films
1940s thriller films
1940s German-language films
Films directed by Eduard von Borsody
Films set in Vienna
Films set on the Orient Express
Austrian black-and-white films